= Lijsbeth Kuijper =

Dutch shipowner

Lijsbeth Kuijper (1778–1828), was a Dutch shipowner.

She was the daughter of the merchant Cornelis Kuijper and married the shipowner Jan Vastert Vas (1773–1824).

After the death of her spouse in 1824, she inherited one of the biggest shipowning business in the Netherlands. She conducted whale and seal hunting on Greenland, the and company was one of the more successful in the nation in the 1820s.

She retired with a large profit in favor of her sister-in-law and business partner Aaltje Vas.
